Richard Brickenden (1701–1779) was the Archdeacon of Wilts from 24 September 1768 until his death.

Education
Richard Brickenden the son of Colwell Brickenden, was educated at John Roysse's Free School in Abingdon, (now Abingdon School) from 1711-1715. and later Corpus Christi College, Oxford B.A (1719), M.A (1723) and ordained priest (1725).

Career
He was Bachelor of Divinity (1730) and Doctor of Divinity (1735). He held livings at Buttermere, Wiltshire, Oborne and Chilton Foliat. The family owned the Advowson and Richard was also Rector of Appleton.

He died on 1 March 1779.

See also
 List of Old Abingdonians

References

Alumni of Corpus Christi College, Oxford
18th-century English Anglican priests
Archdeacons of Wilts
1779 deaths
1701 births
People educated at Abingdon School